Savina is both a given name and a surname. As a surname in Slavic countries it is the feminine counterpart of Savin
Given name
Savina of Milan (died 311), Christian martyr and saint
 Empress Savina, in the 2000 film Dungeons & Dragons
Savina Cuéllar, Bolivian politician
Savina Yannatou (born 1959), Greek classical and jazz singer

Surname
Carlo Savina (1919–2002), Italian composer and conductor
François Marie Savina (1876–1941), Frenchman who worked as a Catholic priest and as an anthropologist
Joseph Savina, (1901–1983), Breton woodworker, cabinet maker and sculptor
Larisa Savina (born 1970), Russian football player
Nina Savina (canoeist) (1915–1965), Soviet sprint canoer
Nina Savina (runner) (born 1993), Belarusian distance runner and gold medalist at the 2018 European Marathon Cup
Valentina Savina (born 1943), Soviet sprint cyclist